Spider-Man Noir (Peter Parker) is a superhero appearing in American comic books published by Marvel Comics.

Part of the Marvel Noir universe (Earth-90214), this alternate version of Spider-Man is a noir-themed take on the character and emerges in a version of New York during the Great Depression. While investigating a smuggling ring, Peter Parker is bitten by what seems to be a highly-venomous spider housed inside a spider-god idol. Falling unconscious, Parker has a vision of the spider-god promising him power. He then awakes inside a cocoon and emerges from it, now possessing super-human abilities similar to a spider. As the feared vigilante "the Spider-Man," Parker wages a one-man war against the criminal underworld in New York City, partly to avenge the deaths of his uncle Ben Parker and his mentor Ben Urich at the hands of the city's major crime lord, Norman Osborn. After Osborn's defeat, Spider-Man Noir continues his vigilante life for years and opposes the forces of Nazi Germany even before the United States enters World War II. In contrast to the Peter Parker of mainstream Marvel continuity, Spider-Man Noir initially uses brutal and lethal force against his enemies and later struggles with the moral implications of this.

Since his conception, the character has appeared in numerous media adaptations. His first appearance in other media was in the 2010 video game Spider-Man: Shattered Dimensions where he was voiced by Christopher Daniel Barnes. In the cartoon series Ultimate Spider-Man, he was voiced by actor Milo Ventimiglia. In the 2018 animated film Spider-Man: Into the Spider-Verse, he was voiced by actor Nicolas Cage.

Publication history
In 2009, Marvel Comics created a line of Marvel Noir comics. Taking place in an alternate universe, these stories reinterpreted familiar Marvel Characters to better reflect a hardboiled/crime noir atmosphere, with most of the adventures taking place in the United States during the Great Depression era. The Marvel Noir version of Peter Parker, was created by writers David Hine and Fabrice Sapolsky, and artists Carmine Di Giandomenico (who drew his first stories) and Marko Djurdjevic (who designed his costume). Though he was not called "Spider-Man Noir" in the stories themselves, Marvel creators and comic fans use this nickname to distinguish him from the mainstream version of Spider-Man.

The Marvel Noir version of Peter Parker first appeared in the four-issue mini-series Spider-Man: Noir #1 in 2009. The character became popular enough to quickly earn a sequel mini-series later that same year, entitled Spider-Man Noir: Eyes Without a Face and produced by the same creative team. Spider-Man Noir appeared as a playable character in the 2010 video game Spider-Man: Shattered Dimensions, a narrative where different Spider-Men across the multiverse joined forces against a common threat. The character was portrayed by actor Christopher Daniel Barnes, who had voiced the character of Peter Parker in the 1994 animated Spider-Man series. This video game marked the first time Spider-Man Noir was depicted as being able to swing travel on web-lines (up to that point in his stories, he only created webbing to ensnare enemies or their weapons).

The character went on to appear in the 2014 story event Spider-Verse, the main series of which was written by Dan Slott who had also scripted Spider-Man: Shattered Dimensions earlier. After this, the hero featured in several multiverse crossover comics such as Secret Wars, the second Spider-Verse series, and Web Warriors. A version of the character  appeared in season three of the animated series Ultimate Spider-Man in 2015, voiced by Milo Ventimiglia. This animated version of Spider-Man Noir was the first to add a fedora hat to his costume.

In 2018, Spider-Man Noir was seemingly killed in the Spider-Geddon storyline, then appeared in December of that year in the theatrical movie Spider-Man: Into the Spider-Verse. Voiced by Nicolas Cage, the film version uses stereotypical 1930s dialogue and wears a slightly altered costume. Following the movie, Spider-Man Noir was resurrected in Spider-Verse vol. 3 #5 in 2020, his appearance, personality, and dialogue now similar to his movie counterpart. An ongoing Spider-Man Noir monthly comic book series began months later the same year, written by Margaret Stohl and with interior art by Juan Ferreyra.

Fictional character biography

Spider-Man Noir Volume 1
On Earth-90214 in the winter of 1932, during the Great Depression, New York City is plagued by many criminal gangs. Daily Bugle photojournalist Ben Urich, known to some criminals as "the Spider," attends a public oration on the struggle of the common citizen by May Parker in Central Park and befriends her nephew Peter Parker. Unable to attend university due to lack of money, Peter shares that his Uncle Ben, who fought in World War I as a pilot, was recently murdered by criminals working for Norman Osborn, an industrialist believed to be the crime lord called Goblin. Peter recalls his Uncle Ben's words regarding the futility and unjust nature of World War I: "If those in power can't be trusted, it's the responsibility of the people to remove them." Peter works for Urich and in December 1932, he ventures to a warehouse of stolen antiques. One artifact — a spider idol — breaks open and releases a horde of spiders. One bites Peter, causing him to pass out and dream of a spider-god who claims it will give Peter power. The young man awakes in a black web cocoon and frees himself, discovering he now has spider-like powers.

Donning a mask, Peter confronts Norman Osborn and is shocked to discover Urich present. The photojournalist has been blackmailing Osborn with his information on the mob boss's activities in exchange for the Goblin fueling his drug habit. Inspired by Peter's determination to fight the Goblin no matter what, Urich decides to expose Osborn's crimes but is murdered. He was color-blinded by an accident with oscorp. Meanwhile, Peter creates a costume using elements of his uncle's World War I-era airman uniform, becoming "the Spider-Man." Urich's former lover Felicia Hardy, owner of the Black Cat club, aids Peter's war on Osborn's criminal syndicate.

In January of 1933, the Spider-Man kills Vulture to save his Aunt May, but the woman declares him just as bad for shooting an unarmed man he could have overpowered and captured instead. After Osborn's gang is largely defeated, Spider-Man has the opportunity to kill the Goblin but decides true justice means the man must stand trial and the truth become public record. Kraven the Hunter, one of Osborn's other cronies who is dying, then attacks the Goblin, killing him. As winter turns to spring, Franklin D. Roosevelt is now President, Hitler rises in power in Europe, May Parker continues being an activist for the common people, and Spider-Man Noir continues fighting crime and corruption.

Eyes Without a Face
Spider-Man Noir: Eyes Without a Face takes place roughly eight months after Spider-Man Noir. In September 1933, Peter Parker continues to operate as a photojournalist and helps at May Parker's soup kitchen along with his friend Mary Jane Watson. Meanwhile, the masked Crime Master rises as the city's new crime boss. Peter develops a relationship with Felicia Hardy, but she insists she is not his girlfriend. Peter and his friend Joseph "Robbie" Robertson, a struggling reporter, investigate the Ellis Island lab of Dr. Otto Octavius and his assistant Dr. Curt Connors, who are conducting strange experiments in mind control for the US government. That night, several kidnapped black people brought by Flint "Sandman" Marko are delivered to Octavius's lab. Secretly working with The Friends of New Germany (TFONG), Octavius intends to prove that "inferior" people can be controlled with brain surgery. Spider-Man tracks the Crime Master and is almost beaten to death by Marko, who is shot dead by the Police while the Crime Master escapes. Discovering she is connected to Spider-Man, the Crime Master attacks and disfigures Felicia Hardy, nearly killing her. Learning that Crime Master is delivering people of color to Octavius, Spider-Man goes to the lab on Ellis Island and finds Robbie, only to find the man has already undergone surgery on the frontal lobe, leaving him without memory or clear free will.

Octavius and Crime Master come to blows and the latter is killed. FBI agent Jean de Wolfe (a male version of Jean DeWolff) arrives and Octavius is arrested. Spider-Man is told Felicia, still recovering from serious injuries and her face now scarred, does not want to see him again. A month later, the government decides to deport Octavius rather than put him on trial publicly and risk he will reveal state secrets. The scientist arrives in Germany only to be humiliated when he realizes the Nazis and Heinrich Himmler believe his congenital disability makes him inferior and his work useless. As time passes, Felicia recovers from her injuries but now wears a mask to cover her scars.

Spider-Verse
The Spider-Verse storyline featured Spider heroes from various alternate realities being hunted by the vampiric Inheritors. The comic tie-in Edge of Spider-Verse #1 returns to Earth-90214 where it is now August, 1939. Peter has been operating as the Spider-Man for six years and finally attended university classes, while his girlfriend Mary Jane spent three years in Spain fighting with the Abraham Lincoln International Brigade. Wilson Fisk is a rising power in crime and sends illusionist Mysterio to kill the Spider-Man. Peter is then recruited by Superior Spider-Man to join a group of Spiders fighting against the Inheritors. Following an adventure in the Secret Wars crossover, Spider-Man Noir joins a team of six Spiders called the Web Warriors that regularly meets to combats threats to other dimensions, particularly those that no longer have a Spider hero of their own.

The inter-dimensional Web of Life and Destiny becomes unstable due to the technology the Web Warriors use to travel between worlds. This causes some realities to bleed into each other and Spider-Man Noir's world to suffer time anomalies. Eventually, the team rights it and new teammate Octavia Otto helps create a better method of traveling between worlds that will not destabilize the Web.

Spider-Geddon and Death
One night in 1940, Spider-Man Noir investigates a weapons sale between Herman Schultz and the Nazis. He fights alongside Felicia Hardy, now on speaking terms with him and operating as the masked vigilante White Widow. Spider-UK arrives and requests Spider-Man Noir on an important mission. The Web Warriors try to stop the Inheritors from using cloning technology to resurrect, but are too late. Spider-Man Noir attempts to kill the Inheritor called Morlun with a grenade, sacrificing himself in the process. The Inheritor survives and drains Spider-Man Noir's remaining life-force, killing him.

Later, Spider-Gwen travels to the Marvel Noir Earth to inform May Parker, Mary Jane, and Felicia Hardy how their version of Peter heroically died. May is furious to find out her nephew was a vigilante, "a broken man," but Mary Jane and Felicia thank Gwen for giving them closure.

Resurrection
In Spider-Verse volume 3 #5 (2020), it is revealed that following his death in Spider-Geddon, Spider-Man Noir woke up alive and well in a web-cocoon on his native Earth-90214, having had a vision of the spider-god telling him his "service" was not finished. Now slightly more introspective and glib, this Peter Parker officially starts working as a private investigator, adopting a slightly new look and a more stereotypical 1930s dialect (similar to his film incarnation from Spider-Man: Into the Spider-Verse). Miles Morales appears and teams-up with Spider-Man Noir to retrieve the spider-god's idol from the Nazis so it can be used to repair the trans-dimensional Web of Life and Destiny. The two succeed in getting the idol back, but Miles warns that taking it away from the Marvel Noir Earth may also remove the spider-god's protection, meaning Parker's next death will be permanent. Spider-Man Noir says he is fine with this as death is supposed to be permanent for everyone and he neither wants nor deserves special treatment.

Spider-Man Noir Volume 2
In 1939, a month after his team-up with Miles Morales, people are starting to realize the Spider-Man is alive and back in action. Peter has re-established ties with Aunt May and Mary Jane Watson, who are both grateful that "a miracle" brought him back from death. Both support his life as a vigilante, but May advises he act more honorably than his instincts sometimes tell him to. As the new series opens, J. Jonah Jameson helps Peter gain access to police crime scenes so the young private eye can investigate a murder and in exchange provide the Daily Bugle with the exclusive story. Peter's investigation into the death of Holly Babson, a waitress at the Black Cat club, leads him to fly to Europe alongside Holly's sister and museum curator, Huma Bergmann, to look more into a cicada gemstone that Holly was holding on to when she died. The two are eventually accompanied by Harry Charles, a pilot who is secretly part of the Dora Milaje named Hu-Ri, and Checkpoint Red, a guide in Instanbul to help them on their journey to Babylon sent by Tony Stark. Throughout their travels, they are pursued by the Nazis and their powerful new weapon Electro. As they approach the temple where the cicada gemstone originated, Huma double-crosses them and reveals that she is the goddess Inanna, who lured them into Babylon and allied with the Nazis. She combines the cicada stone with the M'Kraan crystal to open a portal to the Underworld, which brings back some of Spider-Man's deceased enemies in the process. During the fight, Peter receives a vision from the spider-god Ereshkigal, who turns out to be Inanna's sister and took on the form of Holly Babson. With her help, Spider-Man destroys the cicada stone and the M'Kraan crystal, defeating Inanna and his undead foes in the process. He later returns to New York where Jameson credits Huma for stopping the Nazis in Babylon.

Powers and abilities
This incarnation of Spider-Man from Earth-90214 has the same basic powers as his classic counterpart: enhanced strength, speed, reflexes, resiliency, and agility proportionate to that of a spider; the ability to have his body cling to sheer walls or other solid surfaces; and a sixth sense which warns him of incoming danger, also known as "spider-sense." While the mainstream Spider-Man uses mechanical web-shooters, Spider-Man Noir has the power to shoot organic webbing from his wrists. In his original two mini-series, Spider-Man Noir does not create web-lines, his dark webbing always manifesting as a spray or net. After his resurrection, his web control is fine enough that he regularly creates web-lines to swing on and web-based projectiles to stun opponents. Through his association with club owner Felicia Hardy, his vigilante activities, his associates at the Daily Bugle, and his occupation as a private investigator, he has a network of contacts throughout the city and several informants in the gangs.

Equipment
In contrast to the mainstream Peter Parker, this Spider-Man's costume is mainly normal clothing of the era matched with a mask. The outfit includes kevlar armor, making it resistant to bullets and explosions. The "costume" part of his outfit includes a mask made with the headgear and the aviator glasses used by his uncle during the Great War. After Spider-Geddon, Spider-Man Noir adopts a more traditional version of the Spider-Man mask colored black and white, though he keeps the goggles rather than relying on built-in lenses. He also begins wearing a fedora with his mask and a new gun belt decorated by a spider-symbol.

Spider-Man Noir regularly uses .45 caliber pistols. He is a skilled marksman, adept in the use of various firearms such as revolvers and the tommy gun. He is willing to kill enemies in certain cases, but largely prefers to only injure criminals. Despite his superhuman abilities, Spider-Man Noir still relies on wearing glasses as Peter Parker, indicating his goggles may also involve prescription lenses.

In other media

Television
 Elements of Spider-Man Noir are incorporated into an alternate timeline incarnation of Spider-Man called Slinger who appears in the Avengers Assemble episode "Planet Doom", voiced by Drake Bell.
 Spider-Man Noir appears in Ultimate Spider-Man, voiced by Milo Ventimiglia. This version is brooding and melancholy towards his hero work, resulting in him severing ties with his versions of May Parker and Mary Jane Watson. In the episode "The Spider-Verse (Part 2)", Spider-Man Noir is forced to work with his "prime" counterpart after the latter's version of the Green Goblin arrives in the Noir dimension to steal Spider-Man Noir's DNA. After helping Spider-Man and Watson save civilians from a falling airship, Spider-Man Noir agrees to stop working alone. In "The Spider-Verse (Part 4)", Spider-Man Noir joins forces with a group of alternate reality Spider-Men to help the "prime" Spider-Man defeat the Spider-Goblin and Electro before returning to his home dimension. In the episode "Return to the Spider-Verse (Part 3)", the "prime" Spider-Man and Kid Arachnid return to the Noir dimension amidst Spider-Man Noir's attempts to stop a gang war between Mr. Fixit and Hammerhead's gangs; with particular focus on the former as he blames him for an accident that killed Watson. As the Spider-Men and Fixit are forced to work together after Hammerhead's minion Martin Li uses a Siege Perilous fragment to become Mister Negative, Spider-Man Noir learns the truth of what happened to Watson and sacrifices himself to save Fixit from Mister Negative's petrification blast before Fixit defeats the supervillain and restores all of his victims to normal. In "Return to the Spider-Verse (Part 4)", Spider-Man Noir is captured by the villainous Wolf Spider, who intends to siphon his powers along with those of his various alternate counterparts until the "prime" Spider-Man defeats him.
 Spider-Man Noir is set to appear in a self-titled live-action TV show created by Amazon, with Orien Uziel serving as a writer and Phil Lord and Christopher Miller as producers.

Film
 Spider-Man Noir appears in Spider-Man: Into the Spider-Verse, voiced by Nicolas Cage. This version talks in a stereotypical "Transatlantic" 1930s dialect similar to Humphrey Bogart, James Cagney, and Edward G. Robinson, all of whom Cage based the character on. Due to his universe being entirely in black and white, Spider-Man Noir is also unfamiliar with colors. He arrives in Miles Morales' universe along with Spider-Ham and Peni Parker due to the Kingpin's super-collider before joining his fellow Spider-People in returning to their respective home dimensions. Along the way, he takes a liking to a Rubik's Cube and takes it back with him to his world.
 The Marvel Cinematic Universe film Spider-Man: Far From Home features a tactical stealth suit given to Peter Parker by Nick Fury, which is inspired by the Spider-Man Noir suit. After Parker wears the suit in a battle against the Fire Elemental in Prague, he becomes known to the public as "Night Monkey", a name made up by his friend Ned Leeds.

Video games
 Spider-Man Noir appears as a playable character in Spider-Man: Shattered Dimensions, voiced by Christopher Daniel Barnes. After defeating his versions of Hammerhead, the Vulture, and the Goblin to claim the Tablet of Order and Chaos fragments they had in their possession, Madame Web brings him and three of his fellow Spider-Men together to fight Mysterio after he absorbs the restored Tablet and destroys reality.
 Spider-Man Noir appears as an unlockable playable character in Marvel Super Hero Squad Online, voiced by Yuri Lowenthal.
 Spider-Man Noir's suit is available as a GameStop exclusive pre-order alternate costume for Spider-Man in The Amazing Spider-Man 2.
 Spider-Man Noir's suit is available as an alternate costume for Spider-Man in Marvel Heroes.
 Spider-Man Noir appears as an unlockable playable character in Spider-Man Unlimited.
 Spider-Man Noir appears as an unlockable playable character in Marvel: Avengers Alliance.
 Spider-Man Noir appears as an unlockable playable character in Lego Marvel Super Heroes 2.
 Spider-Man Noir's suit is available as an alternate costume for the titular character of Marvel's Spider-Man.

Miscellaneous
The Simpsons episode "Treehouse of Horror XXXI" features a segment called "Into the Homerverse", a parody of Spider-Man: Into the Spider-Verse. One of the alternate universe versions of Homer Simpson that appears is a monochromatic, hard-boiled private eye who wears a trench coat and fedora, based on Spider-Man Noir.

References

External links
 Spider-Man Noir at Marvel Wiki

Marvel Comics limited series
Comics characters introduced in 2009
Fictional characters from New York City
Fictional characters with superhuman durability or invulnerability
Fictional characters with superhuman senses
Fictional detectives
Fictional gunfighters in comics
Marvel Comics characters who can move at superhuman speeds
Marvel Comics characters with accelerated healing
Marvel Comics characters with superhuman strength
Marvel Comics mutates
Neo-noir comics
Alternative versions of Spider-Man
Spider-Man characters
Vigilante characters in comics